"She Means Nothing to Me" is a song recorded by Phil Everly and British singer Cliff Richard, released as a single in 1983 as the second single from Phil Everly's eponymous album. The song reached number 9 in the UK Singles Chart. The song was written by Welsh musician and songwriter John David.
Cliff Richard included a remixed version of the track with louder vocals on his 1984 album The Rock Connection.

Personnel 
As per the album liner notes and record centre-label:
 Phil Everly – lead vocals
 Cliff Richard – lead vocals, backing vocals
 Terry Williams – drums
 Mickey Gee – rhythm guitar, electric rhythm
 Mark Knopfler – rhythm guitar
 John David – lead guitar
 Pete Wingfield – electric piano
 Stuart Colman – bass, 6-string bass, reverse lead guitar, Korg, claps, fingerpops
 Rod Houison – percussion, engineer
 Neill King – engineer

Chart performance

References

External links
 

1983 singles
1983 songs
Cliff Richard songs
Capitol Records singles
Songs written by John David (musician)